Eagle Island State Park is a public recreation area on the southwest outskirts of the city of Eagle, Idaho. The state park covers  that are bordered by the north and south channels of the Boise River. The park's recreational facilities include swimming beach, picnic area, equestrian trails, and a water slide.

History
The grazing land where the park stands was purchased by the state in 1929 and used as a penitentiary farm until 1977, when the site was turned over to the Idaho Department of Lands. In response to a poll concerning disposition of the land in the local newspaper, the Land Board voted to set aside the property to be managed as Eagle Island State Park. The park was dedicated in 1983.

In his 2006 State of the State Address, Idaho Governor Dirk Kempthorne envisioned a Central Park-like future for Eagle Island, which was followed in 2010 by talk of disbanding the parks department he had formerly headed.

Activities and amenities
The park offers a snow tubing hill that run typically from Thanksgiving to April 1 with skiing and snowboarding as well. A Sportsman's Access area offers fishing opportunities along the river.

See also

 List of Idaho state parks
 National Parks in Idaho

References

External links
Eagle Island State Park Idaho Parks and Recreation
Eagle Island State Park Map Idaho Parks and Recreation

Protected areas of Ada County, Idaho
State parks of Idaho
Protected areas established in 1983